Ken Russell (November 2, 1935 – March 11, 2014) was an American football tackle. He played for the Detroit Lions from 1957 to 1959.

He died on March 11, 2014, in Walbridge, Ohio at age 78.

References

1935 births
2014 deaths
American football tackles
Bowling Green Falcons football players
Detroit Lions players